Dahme (also: Dahme/Mark) is a town in the Teltow-Fläming district of Brandenburg, Germany. It is situated on the Dahme River, 30 km southeast of Luckenwalde, and 38 km west of Lübbenau.

History
From 1815 to 1947, Dahme was part of the Prussian Province of Brandenburg. From 1952 to 1990, it was part of the Bezirk Cottbus of East Germany.

Demography

Notable people

 Karsten Greve (born 1946), an internationally renowned art dealer.
 Johannes Groenland (1824–1891), botanist and microscopist who worked for Vilmorin and was a professor of natural science in Dahme.
 Hermann Hellriegel (1831–1895), first head of the agricultural test station in Dahme from 1857 to 1873
 Max Jacob (1849–1921), architect
 Roswitha Krause (born 1949), swimmer and handball player
 Günther Marks (1897–1978), church musician and composer; lecturer for organ play and church music at the evangelical seminar in Dahme
 Otto Unverdorben (1806–1873), discoverer of the Aniline
 Birgit Vanderbeke (1956–2021), writer

References

Localities in Teltow-Fläming